The Edward C. Hochapfel House, also known as the Marandas Apartments, was an historic building located at 1520 Southwest 11th Avenue, in Portland, Oregon. The structure was completed in 1904 and exhibited Bungalow/American Craftsman  and Colonial Revival architecture. It was added to the National Register of Historic Places in August 1983, but later demolished.

See also
 National Register of Historic Places listings in Southwest Portland, Oregon

References

1904 establishments in Oregon
Bungalow architecture in Oregon
Colonial Revival architecture in Oregon
Demolished buildings and structures in Portland, Oregon
Former National Register of Historic Places in Portland, Oregon
Houses completed in 1904
Southwest Portland, Oregon